Svante Herman Nils Ödman (born 22 June 1943) is a Swedish curler.

He is a 1978 Swedish men's curling champion.

In 1976, he was inducted into the Swedish Curling Hall of Fame.

Teams

Men's

Mixed

References

External links
 

Living people
1943 births
Swedish male curlers
Swedish curling champions